Survivor: Guatemala — The Maya Empire (commonly referred to as Survivor: Guatemala) is the eleventh season of the American CBS competitive reality television series Survivor. Filming took place from June 27, 2005 through August 4, 2005 and the season premiered on September 15, 2005. It was filmed in the Yaxhá-Nakúm-Naranjo National Park near the more popular Tikal National Park, located in northern Guatemala. Originally, the season was scheduled to be filmed in a location on the Indian Ocean, with scouting taking place in Madagascar, Southern India and Sri Lanka. However, due to the 2004 Indian Ocean earthquake and tsunami, the plans were scrapped.

Hosted by Jeff Probst, it consisted of the usual 39 days of gameplay with 18 competitors.

This season also featured the return of Survivor: Palau contestants Stephenie LaGrossa and Bobby Jon Drinkard. Aside from the staple twists such as the double Tribal Council and the tribe switch, a new twist called the hidden immunity idol was introduced. The tribes merged with ten remaining players, naming their tribe Xhakúm. After the merge, they received news that an immunity idol was hidden somewhere at camp. Whoever possessed the idol had to use it before the tribe voted. After usage, the idol would be discarded. The idol was only valid until there were four remaining contestants. Danni Boatwright won the title of Sole Survivor, defeating LaGrossa in a 6–1 jury vote.

Casting
While the plan for the season always included two former castaways returning for a second chance, there were several discarded concepts and themes for these returnees. Rodger Bingham and Michael Skupin, both from Survivor: The Australian Outback, were in talks to be the returnees, as were Jonathan Libby and Wanda Shirk, both eliminated on Day 2 of Survivor: Palau after not being selected to join a tribe. Skupin eventually returned in Survivor: Philippines. Additionally, Hunter Ellis from Marquesas allegedly turned down an offer to return.

Contestants

Notable cast members include former Survivor: Palau castaways, Stephenie LaGrossa and Bobby Jon Drinkard, former beauty queen and model-turned radio announcer Danni Boatwright, ex-NFL quarterback Gary Hogeboom, and film and television writer Rafe Judkins.

Future appearances
Stephenie LaGrossa competed for her third time on Survivor: Heroes vs. Villains. Danni Boatwright returned for Survivor: Winners at War.  Outside of Survivor, LaGrossa competed on the USA Network reality competition series, Snake in the Grass. In 2023, LaGrossa competed on the Peacock reality TV series The Traitors.

Season summary
Sixteen of the 18 players in the game were already split into two tribes, Nakúm and Yaxhá; both tribes received one additional tribe member, Bobby Jon and Stephenie, respectively, both who had previously appeared on Survivor: Palau; Probst described these players as resources to help either tribe, but otherwise had no safety against being voted out. The first challenge began immediately, requiring both tribes to trek  overnight through the jungle to one of the camps near Mayan ruins, along with any available supplies that they wished to carry. The trek left many of the players exhausted and dehydrated for several days following.

During the first nine days, the Nakúm tribe proved more successful at the challenges losing only one immunity challenge, sending Yaxhá to Tribal Council twice. During one challenge, Danni, a sportscaster, identified Gary as a former professional quarterback, though Gary would maintain that he was just a landscaper through most of the rest of the game. A tribal switch occurred on Day Ten that left Bobby Jon, Danni, Blake, and Brandon in the majority at Yaxhá, outnumbering Brian, Amy, and Gary. At Nakúm, the tribe was split 4–4 with Margaret, Judd, Cindy, and Brooke from the original Nakúm and Stephenie, Rafe, Jamie, and Lydia from the original Yaxhá. Immediately after the swap, Stephenie and Jamie formed an alliance with Judd to take control of Nakúm, which later included Rafe, Cindy, and Lydia. Though the two tribes performances were fairly even in wins and losses, a crucial immunity challenge won by Nakúm put them in a decisive 6–4 lead into the merge over Yaxhá. On Night 18, directly after the Yaxhá tribe had voted off Amy, they left for the Nakúm campsite where the two tribes merged into the Xhákúm tribe. Upon merging, the new tribe was informed of a hidden immunity idol located in the jungle, that could be used before the votes were cast to save themselves. However, the Nakúm alliance of six held strong initially as they voted off Brandon.

As a reward for winning a reward challenge, Judd received a clue to the hidden idol. To distract the other players, Judd lied about the clue's contents, which Gary was able to pick up on, locating the idol himself and using it to save himself from being eliminated at the next Tribal Council, where Bobby Jon was voted off in his place. Judd's lie became a focal point for Gary to attempt to break the original Nakúm voting block; though Gary was soon voted off, Stephenie and the other former Nakúm members felt Judd was no longer trustworthy and voted him out. At the reward challenge for the final five, a car was the reward prize. Cindy won the challenge, but was given an option by Jeff as a means to break the Survivor "car curse" (that no player that has won a car continued on to win the game) by exchanging her prize to give a car to each of the other four players. Cindy ultimately rejected the option, and was voted off at the next Tribal Council.

After Lydia's elimination, Stephenie became concerned on an earlier deal made by Rafe and Danni to take each other to the Final Tribal Council; though she struggled to remain in the final immunity challenge and outlast Danni, she ultimately lost, becoming emotional over her failure. Rafe informed Danni that she did not have to stay true to their previous deal, and at the following Tribal Council, Danni eliminated Rafe. The jury at the Final Tribal Council considered that Stephenie has played a more devious game than Danni and had backstabbed several of them, and ultimately gave Danni's more social play the win, six votes to one.

In the case of multiple tribes or castaways who win reward or immunity, they are listed in order of finish, or alphabetically where it was a team effort; where one castaway won and invited others, the invitees are in brackets.

Episodes

Voting history

Reception
Survivor: Guatemala was met with a mixed reception by fans and critics. Particular criticism revolved around the social conduct of runner-up Stephenie LaGrossa, which was seen as a reversal from her heroic behavior in Survivor Palau. The gameplay of winner Danni Boatwright also received mixed to negative reception. Her strategy of not revealing her gameplay moves to the cameras at any point helped her to go far in the game, but rendered her relatively invisible until the late-game. Boatwright ranked placed 27th out of the first 34 winners in a fan poll conducted by Entertainment Weekly in 2017. Dalton Ross of Entertainment Weekly ranked this season 33rd out of 40 due to its unlikeable cast. In 2014, Joe Reid of The Wire ranked this season 15th out of 27. In 2015, a poll by Rob Has a Podcast ranked this season 21st out of 30 with Rob Cesternino ranking this season 13th. This was updated in 2021 during Cesternino's podcast, Survivor All-Time Top 40 Rankings, ranking 27th out of 40th. In 2020, Survivor fan site "Purple Rock Podcast" ranked this season 23rd out of 40. Later that same year, Inside Survivor ranked this season 25th out of 40 saying "it's neither horrible nor amazing. There are some great moments, ranging from the dramatic to the comedic. But sometimes those moments are forgotten due to what is relatively mediocre gameplay."

References

External links
 Official CBS Survivor Guatemala Website

11
2005 American television seasons
2005 in Guatemala
Television shows filmed in Guatemala